Il Secolo XIX is an Italian newspaper published in Genoa, Italy, founded in March 1886, subsequently acquired by Ferdinando Maria Perrone in 1897 from Ansaldo. It is one of the first Italian newspapers to be printed in colour.

On 16 January 2006, its 129th anniversary, the local radio "Radio 19" was launched (receivable also on the Metropolitana di Genova).

In 1997 Il Secolo XIX had a circulation of 127,825 copies. The 2008 circulation of the paper was 103,223 copies.

References

External links
 Official website 

1886 establishments in Italy
Italian-language newspapers
Mass media in Genoa
Daily newspapers published in Italy
Publications established in 1886